Fedde Le Grand (born 7 September 1977) is a Dutch house DJ, record producer and remixer.

Biography
In 2006, his single  "Put Your Hands Up 4 Detroit" reached the top five on the Dutch Top 40, number one in the UK Singles Chart and spent five weeks on the dance charts in Spain.

Discography

 Output (2009)
 Something Real (2016)

Awards and nominations 
{| class="wikitable sortable plainrowheaders" 
|-
! scope="col" | Award
! scope="col" | Year
! scope="col" | Category
! scope="col" | Nominee(s)
! scope="col" | Result
! scope="col" class="unsortable"| 
|-
! scope="row" rowspan=2|Beatport Music Awards
| rowspan=2|2012
| Best Remix
| "Paradise" (Fedde Le Grand Remix)
| 
| rowspan=2|
|-
| Best Techno Track
| "Metrum"
| 
|-
! scope="row"|Billboard Music Awards
| 2008
| Top Hot Dance Airplay Track
| "Let Me Think About It"
|
| 
|-
! scope="row" rowspan=2|DJ Awards
| 2007
| Best Breakthrough
| rowspan=2|Fedde Le Grand
| 
|rowspan=2|
|-
| 2008
| Best House DJ
| 
|-
! scope="row" rowspan=2|Danish Deejay Awards
| rowspan=2|2008
| Danish Deejay-Favourite
| rowspan=2|"Let Me Think About It"
| 
|rowspan=2|
|-
| Dancechart.dk Award
| 
|-
! scope="row" rowspan=5|International Dance Music Awards
| rowspan=3|2007
| Best Breakthrough Solo Artist
| Fedde Le Grand
| 
|rowspan=3|
|-
| Best Underground Dance Track
| rowspan=2|"Put Your Hands Up 4 Detroit"
| 
|-
| rowspan=2|Best Breaks/Electro Dance Track
| 
|-
| 2008
| "Let Me Think About It"
| 
|
|-
| 2015
| Best Progressive House/Electro DJ 
| Fedde Le Grand
| 
|
|-
! scope="row"|MTV Australia Awards
| 2007
| Best Dance Video
| "Put Your Hands Up 4 Detroit"
| 
|
|-
! scope="row"|MTV Europe Music Awards
| 2009
| Best Dutch & Belgian Act
| Fedde Le Grand
| 
|
|-
! scope="row"|P3 Guld Awards
| 2008
| Listener's Favourite Hit
| "Let Me Think About It"
| 
| 
|-
! scope="row"|Zulu Awards
| 2008
| Best Danish Hit
| "Let Me Think About It"
| 
|

DJ Magazine

Top 100 DJs rankings 
In DJ Magazine, Fedde Le Grand debuted on the rankings at 22nd in 2007.

References

External links
 
 

1977 births
Living people
Dutch DJs
Club DJs
Remixers
Dutch house musicians
Musicians from Utrecht (city)
Progressive house musicians
Electronic dance music DJs